DAV Public School, CWS Jayant is situated in Jayant, Singrauli, Madhya Pradesh, India. The school has well 2.0 acre campus serving 1300 students under the faculty of 51 staffs headed by Ashok Mishra, Principal of this school.

Location
The school is located in CWS colony of Jayant city in Singrauli District in Madhya Pradesh. The school is under D.A.V. College Managing Committee. The school is monitored by DAV MP Zone.

Facilities
The school has a playground with approximately 50 classrooms along with computer lab and library. The school also has a music set. The school also has well teacher's room. The school has approximately 51 staff serving 1300 students.

See also
 DAV Public School, Waidhan 
 DAV Public School, Dudhichua

References

Schools in Singrauli district
Schools affiliated with the Arya Samaj
Primary schools in India
High schools and secondary schools in Madhya Pradesh
Educational institutions established in 1996
1996 establishments in Madhya Pradesh